Vikram Lal (born 1942) is an Indian businessman, the founder and former CEO of Eicher Motors, Indian commercial vehicle manufacturer based in New Delhi, India. He has been a member of the board of directors of The Doon School.

He studied mechanical engineering at the Technische Universität Darmstadt.

He joined Eicher India, the family company established by his father, in 1966. Eicher started as the first tractor manufacturer in India in 1959 under the company name Eicher Tractor Corporation of India Pvt. Ltd., as a joint venture with German tractor manufacturer Eicher, and eventually branched out into light commercial vehicles in 1986, and then into heavy vehicles.

His son Siddhartha Lal is now CEO of Eicher Motors. His daughter Simran runs Good Earth.

Lal spents his retirement years volunteering at his own Goodearth Education Foundation.

References

External links 
 Interview by The Tribune
 - Vikram Lal, The Times of India

1942 births
Living people
Businesspeople from Delhi
Indian billionaires
The Doon School alumni
Punjabi people
Technische Universität Darmstadt alumni
Eicher Motors